Rag, rags, RAG or The Rag may refer to:

Common uses
 Rag, a piece of old cloth
 Rags, tattered clothes
 Rag (newspaper), a publication engaging in tabloid journalism
 Rag paper, or cotton paper

Arts and entertainment

Film
 Rags (1915 film), a silent film
 Rags (2012 film), a modernization of the Cinderella fairy tale

Music
 Rag, a piece of ragtime music
 Rags (musical), a 1986 Broadway musical
 Ruhrpott AG, a German hip hop group 
 Rags, a former name of the band Tin Huey
 Rags (EP), by EarthGang, 2017

Other uses in arts and entertainment
 Rags (novel), a 2001 Doctor Who novel
 Rags, a dog character in TV show Spin City

Businesses and organisations
 RAG AG, a German coal mining corporation
 RAG Austria AG, a gas storage operator in Austria
 RAGS International, later Messiah Foundation International, a spiritual organisation

People
Rags (nickname), a list of people known as Rags
Ēriks Rags (born 1975), a Latvian javelin thrower

Places
 Rag Island, in the Seal Islands group, Australia
 Rag River, in County Cavan, Ireland

Other uses
 Royal Galician Academy (Galician: Real Academia Galega), in A Coruña, Galicia, Spain
The Rag, an underground paper in Austin, Texas, 1966–1977
 Rag (student society), a student-run charitable fundraising group
 Rag (typography), the ragged edge of a block of text
 Recombination-activating gene, encoding enzymes RAG-1 and RAG-2
 RAG rating (Red, Amber, Green), a traffic light rating system
Ragioniere or rag., an Italian honorific for a school graduate in business economics
 Rags (dog) (1916–1936), 1st Infantry Division (United States) mascot in World War I
 The Rag (club), alternative name for the Army and Navy Club in London

See also 

 Rag and Bone (disambiguation)
 Rag doll (disambiguation)
 Raga or raag, a melodic framework for improvisation in Indian classical music
 Ragga, a subgenre of dancehall and reggae music
 Ragging, initiation rituals in higher education institutions in the Indian subcontinent 
 Rags to riches (disambiguation)
 Rags Brook, a tributary of the River Lea in England
 Ragulator-Rag complex, in cell biology
 On the rag, a reference to menstruation